Eldred is a village in Greene County, Illinois, United States. The population was 201 at the 2010 census.

History
Eldred was founded because of its situation in the Illinois River Bottoms as a town that combined the values of a river and a bluff-side village. Eldred first appeared on river plat books as "Farrow Town" in the 1830s, but was founded sometime before the admittance of Illinois as a state in 1818. A few of its original founders, were of Scotch-Irish ancestry from the Upland South.

Geography
Eldred is located in southwestern Greene County at  (39.286663, -90.553458). Illinois Route 108 passes through the village, leading east  to Carrollton, the Greene County seat, and west  to the Illinois River and the Kampsville ferry.

The bottoms were systematically drained during the 1920s, which caused much contention among the villagers as to the merits of drainage. Nevertheless, the drainage occurred and created a great expanse of farmland for the counties along the river.

Demographics

As of the 2000 United States Census, there were 211 people, 97 households, and 54 families residing in the village. The racial makeup of the village was 97.63% White, 0.95% Asian, and 1.42% from two or more races.

There were 97 households, out of which 23.7% had children under the age of 18 living with them, 40.2% were married couples living together, 9.3% had a female householder with no husband present, and 44.3% were non-families. 32.0% of all households were made up of individuals, and 22.7% had someone living alone who was 65 years of age or older.  The average household size was 2.18 and the average family size was 2.69.

In the village, the population was spread out, with 20.9% under the age of 18, 7.6% from 18 to 24, 21.8% from 25 to 44, 29.9% from 45 to 64, and 19.9% who were 65 years of age or older.  The median age was 45 years. For every 100 females, there were 91.8 males.  For every 100 females age 18 and over, there were 87.6 males.

The median income for a household in the village was $26,250, and the median income for a family was $23,438. Males had a median income of $22,917 versus $17,115 for females. The per capita income for the village was $13,772.  About 29.1% of families and 37.2% of the population were below the poverty line, including 74.5% of those under the age of eighteen and 25.8% of those 65 or over.

References

Villages in Greene County, Illinois
Villages in Illinois